The Mayor of Oyster Bay is a 2002 film directed by Marcy Carsey and David Israel.

Starring 
 Joan Blair
 T.J. McCormack
 Ashley Tisdale
 Brian Turk

External links 
 

2002 television films
2002 films
2002 comedy films
2000s English-language films